Yumo Mikyö Dorjé was a student of the Kashmiri scholar Somanātha and an 11th-century Kalachakra master. Yumo Mikyö Dorjé is regarded as one of the earliest Tibetan articulators of a shentong view of śūnyatā — an understanding of the absolute radiant nature of reality. Emphasized within the Kalachakra tantra and Gautama Buddha's teachings on Buddha-nature in the so-called Third Turning of the Wheel of the Dharma of the Yogacara school of Buddhism philosophy; this view later became emblematic of the Jonang tradition of Tibetan Buddhism.

References

External links
 Early Jonangpa in Tibet, Jonang Foundation

Scholars of Buddhism from Tibet
Jonang
Lamas
Tibetan Buddhist spiritual teachers
Year of birth missing
Year of death missing
Tibetan Buddhists from Tibet
Shentong